The E. Brown House is an historic house located at 7 Sutton Street, in Uxbridge, Massachusetts.  It is a -story wood-frame structure, five bays wide, with a side-gable roof, central chimney, and clapboard siding.  Despite its otherwise vernacular construction, it has fine quality Federal styling, with corner pilasters and cornice.  The cornice and the door surround appear to be carved based on published drawings of Asher Benjamin.  The western wing is a 20th-century addition.

On October 7, 1983, it was added to the National Register of Historic Places.

See also
National Register of Historic Places listings in Uxbridge, Massachusetts

References

External links
 E. Brown House MACRIS Listing

Houses in Uxbridge, Massachusetts
National Register of Historic Places in Uxbridge, Massachusetts
Houses on the National Register of Historic Places in Worcester County, Massachusetts
Federal architecture in Massachusetts